Obuasi Senior High Technical School is a co-educational second-cycle public high school institution in Obuasi in the Ashanti Region of Ghana. The school recently reached the quarter-finals of the National Science and Maths Quiz Competition. They have won the Ashanti regional Milo soccer competition in 2005 and 2015. In the Zonal Inter Colleges Athletics competition, they have won several times Students of the school were claimed to have created 'a touchless bin' in the fight against COVID-19.

Also was the first school to win the maiden Sci-Tech Innovation Challenge, 2021.

See also

 Education in Ghana
 List of senior high schools in the Ashanti Region

References

Educational institutions established in 1965
Ashanti Region
High schools in Ghana
Public schools in Ghana
Technical schools
1965 establishments in Ghana